Uribe is a Basque surname.

Geographical distribution
As of 2014, 37.1% of all known bearers of the surname Uribe were residents of Mexico (frequency 1:1,373), 26.3% of Colombia (1:747), 10.8% of Chile (1:671), 9.2% of the United States (1:16,102), 3.9% of Peru (1:3,357), 3.8% of Venezuela (1:3,282), 2.3% of the Dominican Republic (1:1,831), 1.8% of Spain (1:10,531), 1.8% of Argentina (1:9,849) and 1.1% of Ecuador (1:6,177).

In Spain, the frequency of the surname was higher than national average (1:10,531) in the following autonomous communities:
 1. Basque Country (1:1,743)
 2. Cantabria (1:5,949)
 3. Balearic Islands (1:7,110)
 4. La Rioja (1:7,565)
 5. Navarre (1:9,226)

In Chile, the frequency of the surname was higher than national average (1:671) in the following regions:
 1. Los Lagos Region (1:128)
 2. Aysén Region (1:184)
 3. Magallanes Region (1:207)
 4. Los Ríos Region (1:238)
 5. Bío Bío Region (1:561)

People

Manuel de Lardizábal y Uribe (1744–1820), Mexican penologist
Manuel Uribe y Troncoso (1867–1959), Mexican ophthalmologist
Luis Uribe (1847–1914), Chilean admiral
Manuel Fernando Serrano Uribe (1789–1819), Colombian statesman
Álvaro Uribe (born 1952), former President of Colombia (2002–2010)
Álvaro Uribe (Uribe DJ) (born 1973), Colombian radio personality
Ana Uribe, Colombian muralist and painter
Ángel Uribe (1943–2008), Peruvian footballer
Aracely Leuquén Uribe (born 1980), Chilean politician
Armando Uribe (1933–2020), Chilean writer, poet, lawyer, and diplomat
Beatriz Elena Uribe Botero, Colombian economist and official
Brenda Uribe (born 1993), Peruvian volleyball player
Cenaida Uribe (born 1965), Peruvian former volleyball player and politician
Cristián Uribe (born 1976), Chilean footballer
Édson Uribe (born 1982), Peruvian footballer
Eduardo Uribe (born 1985), Peruvian footballer
Federico Uribe (born 1962), Colombian artist
Fernando Uribe (born 1988), Colombian footballer
Gabriel Ochoa Uribe (born 1939), former Colombian football player and manager
George Uribe (born 1968), U.S. television producer
Guillermo Uribe Holguín (1880–1971), Colombian composer and violinist
Hector Uribe (born 1946), Texas politician
Ignacio Uribe (born 1933), Spanish footballer
Imanol Uribe (born 1950), Spanish screenwriter and film director
Jorge Alberto Uribe (born 1940), Colombian politician
José Uribe (1959–2006), Dominican baseball player
Juan Uribe (born 1979), Dominican baseball player
Julio César Uribe (born 1958), Peruvian football manager and former player
Kirmen Uribe (born 1970), Basque poet
Manuel Uribe Ángel (1822–1904), Colombian physician, geographer, and politician
María Cristina Uribe, Colombian journalist and news presenter
María Teresa Uribe (1940–2019), Colombian sociologist
Mariajo Uribe (born 1990), Colombian professional golfer  
Mario Montoya Uribe (born 1949), Colombian general
Mario Uribe Escobar (born 1949), Colombian politician
Mateus Uribe (born 1991), Colombian footballer
Rafael Uribe Uribe (1859–1914), Colombian politician and general
Sofía Gómez Uribe (born 1992), Colombian freediver and civil engineer

References

Basque-language surnames